The Missouri Southern Competition was a biannual international piano competition organized by the Missouri Southern State University first held in 1987. It was dissolved in 2008 following the retirement of its director, Vivian León.

Selected list of jurors
  Enrique Graf
  Tong-Il Han
  Martin Jones
  Ming-Qiang Li
  Oleg Volkov
  Ramzi Yassa

Prize winners

References
 Missouri Southern International Piano Competition

Piano competitions in the United States